Viento State Park is a state park in north central Hood River County, Oregon, near the city of Hood River. The park, named for the former Viento railroad station located there, is administered by the Oregon Parks and Recreation Department. The park is on the south bank of the Columbia River in the Columbia River Gorge. Interstate 84 and the Union Pacific Railroad pass through the park. It offers a seasonal, full-service campground, access to gorge hiking trails beyond park boundaries, a day-use area and river access for windsurfing and kiteboarding.

The park is in the Columbia River Gorge National Scenic Area. The name Viento was constructed using letters from the names of Henry Villard of the Northern Pacific Railroad; William Endicott, a Boston banker; and a contractor named Tolman.

See also
 List of Oregon State Parks
 Starvation Creek State Park
 Historic Columbia River Highway

References

External links
 

State parks of Oregon
Columbia River Gorge
Parks in Hood River County, Oregon
Historic Columbia River Highway
IUCN Category V